Ascioplaga is a genus of beetles in the family Cupedidae, containing two species endemic to New Caledonia.

References

Archostemata genera
Cupedidae